There are over 20,000 Grade II* listed buildings in England.  This page is a list of these buildings in the county of Merseyside.

Knowsley

|}

Liverpool

|}

Sefton

|}

St. Helens

|}

Wirral

|}

See also
 :Category:Grade II* listed buildings in Merseyside

Notes

References 
National Heritage List for England

External links

 
Merseyside
Lists of listed buildings in Merseyside